Frank Cannon may refer to:

Frank Cannon (footballer) (1888–1916), English footballer
Frank J. Cannon (1859–1933), United States Senator from Utah
Franklin Cannon (1794–1863), Lieutenant Governor of Missouri
Frank Cannon (drag racer), American drag racer, early user of a front engine dragster
Frank Cannon, fictional title character of the U.S. TV series Cannon
Ardath Mayhar (1930–2012), American author who used the pseudonym Frank Cannon